Dominican Republic competed at the 2019 World Aquatics Championships in Gwangju, South Korea from 12 to 28 July.

Diving

Dominican Republic entered two divers.

Men

Swimming

Dominican Republic has entered four swimmers.

Men

Women

References

Nations at the 2019 World Aquatics Championships
Dominican Republic at the World Aquatics Championships
2019 in Dominican Republic sport